La Ronde-Haye is a former commune in the Manche department in Normandy in north-western France. On 1 January 2019, it was merged into the new commune Saint-Sauveur-Villages.

See also
Communes of the Manche department

References

Rondehaye